The Junior men's race at the 2000 IAAF World Cross Country Championships was held at the Sporting Complex in Vilamoura, Portugal, on March 19, 2000.  Reports of the event were given in The New York Times, in the Glasgow Herald, and for the IAAF.

Complete results for individuals, for teams, medallists, and the results of British athletes who took part were published.

Race results

Junior men's race (8.08 km)

Individual

Teams

Note: Athletes in parentheses did not score for the team result

Participation
An unofficial count yields the participation of 162 athletes from 43 countries in the Junior men's race. This is in agreement with the official numbers as published.

 (6)
 (1)
 (4)
 (4)
 (6)
 (1)
 (4)
 (1)
 (4)
 (1)
 (3)
 (6)
 (6)
 (4)
 (5)
 (6)
 (6)
 (6)
 (4)
 (1)
 (6)
 (5)
 (2)
 (1)
 (6)
 (6)
 (1)
 (4)
 (2)
 (5)
 (6)
 (1)
 (1)
 (4)
 (2)
 (1)
 (4)
 (5)
 (6)
 (6)
 (4)
 (4)
 (1)

See also
 2000 IAAF World Cross Country Championships – Senior men's race
 2000 IAAF World Cross Country Championships – Men's short race
 2000 IAAF World Cross Country Championships – Senior women's race
 2000 IAAF World Cross Country Championships – Women's short race
 2000 IAAF World Cross Country Championships – Junior women's race

References

Junior men's race at the World Athletics Cross Country Championships
IAAF World Cross Country Championships
2000 in youth sport